Leib Weissberg (January 9, 1893 – 1942) was a Slavonski Brod rabbi who was killed during the Holocaust.

Weissberg was born in Probużna (then part of Austria-Hungary) to Jewish parents Seide and Ehaja (née Ringel) Weissberg. He was married to Adela (née Taubes) Weissberg with whom he had two sons: Samuel (born on April 25, 1933, in Brod na Savi) and Saadia (born on December 28, 1936, in Slavonski Brod). Weissberg was educated at the rabbinical seminary "Israelitisch-theologische Lehranstalt Vienna". He didn't know any Croatian when he arrived in Brod with his wife, but he quickly learned it. Weissberg was a rabbi of the Jewish Community of Slavonski Brod until World War II. His wife would often replace him at religious classes. Weissberg and his family were deported to Jasenovac concentration camp where they all were killed in 1942. Weissberg was the last rabbi of Slavonski Brod until this day.

References

Bibliography 

1893 births
1942 deaths
Austro-Hungarian rabbis
Croatian Austro-Hungarians
Croatian civilians killed in World War II
Croatian Jews who died in the Holocaust
Croatian people executed in Nazi concentration camps
Croatian people of Polish-Jewish descent
20th-century Croatian rabbis
Orthodox rabbis
People from Ternopil Oblast
People from Slavonski Brod
People from the Kingdom of Galicia and Lodomeria
People who died in Jasenovac concentration camp